Michael Cooper (born 1956) is an American basketball coach and former player.

Michael Cooper may also refer to:

Sports
Michael Cooper (footballer) (born 1999), English goalkeeper for Plymouth Argyle
Michael Cooper (racing driver) (born 1989), American race car driver
Michael Cooper (rower), British rower who competed in the 1968 and 1972 Summer Olympics
Michael Cooper (rugby league) (born 1988), English rugby league footballer

Other
Michael Cooper (economist) (1938–2017), British economist
Michael Cooper (historian) (1930–2018), historical writer on Japan
Michael Cooper (musician) (born 1950), founding member of the reggae band Third World
Michael Cooper (photographer) (1941–1973), British photographer
Michael Cooper (politician) (born 1984), Canadian politician
Michael Cooper, American musician, lead singer and guitarist for the R&B band, Con Funk Shun

See also
Mike Cooper (disambiguation)